Powell Point is an Unincorporated community in Fort Bend County, Texas, United States.

The area is named after Elizabeth Powell, who received the original land grant there from the Mexican Government in 1831.

Government and infrastructure
Fort Bend County does not have a hospital district. OakBend Medical Center serves as the county's charity hospital which the county contracts with.

Education
Powell Point is served by the Lamar Consolidated Independent School District (LCISD). Students are zoned to Beasley Elementary School in Beasley, Wright Junior High School (grades 6-8), and Randle High School.

Previously, Kendleton Independent School District (KISD) operated Powell Point Elementary School in the community and served elementary school residents. Beginning in 1985 LCISD served secondary school students in the KISD territory. As a result of the 2010 KISD closure, students at Powell Point were rezoned to Beasley Elementary and Wessendorff Middle School. LCISD, for a two-year period, will operate its Head Start program at Powell Point. The upper elementary and secondary zoning previously consisted of: Wessendorff Middle School, Lamar Junior High School, and Lamar Consolidated High School. Wright and Randle opened in 2021.

The designated community college for LCISD, and for the former Kendleton ISD, is Wharton County Junior College.

References

External links

Unincorporated communities in Fort Bend County, Texas
Unincorporated communities in Texas